Overton is a village and civil parish in Lancashire, England, south west of Lancaster and south of Morecambe between Heysham and the estuary of the River Lune. Neighbouring villages include Middleton and Sunderland Point; Glasson is on the opposite side of the river.  The parish had a population of 1,069 at the 2011 Census.

History
Overton was known as Oureton, when it was listed in the Domesday Book. The village contains St Helen's Church, which is claimed to be oldest church in Lancashire.

Governance
An electoral ward of the same name, stretching to Middleton and the surrounding area, had a population of 2,414 at the 2011 Census.

See also

Listed buildings in Overton, Lancashire

References

External links 

GENUKI page
Heysham Heritage Centre page

Villages in Lancashire
Civil parishes in Lancashire
Geography of the City of Lancaster